There are 60 colleges and universities in the U.S. state of Alabama. The University of Alabama in Tuscaloosa is the largest university in the state with  38,100 enrolled for fall 2019.  Jefferson State Community College in Birmingham, Alabama is the largest two-year college, with an enrollment of just over 8,000. The smallest institution is Heritage Christian University, a Churches of Christ-affiliated seminary, with an enrollment of 86 students. The oldest institution is Athens State University in Athens founded in 1822. There are also 8 four-year and 3 two-year historically black colleges and universities which is more than any other state.

The majority of Alabama's colleges and universities are accredited by the Southern Association of Colleges and Schools (SACS), although several are accredited by the Association for Biblical Higher Education (ABHE), the Council on Occupational Education (COE), or the Distance Education Accrediting Commission (DEAC).

The University of Alabama at Birmingham, the University of South Alabama, the Alabama College of Osteopathic Medicine, and the Edward Via College of Osteopathic Medicine feature the only medical schools in the state.  The University of Alabama School of Law, the Cumberland School of Law at Samford University, and the Thomas Goode Jones School of Law at Faulkner University are American Bar Association-accredited law schools.  The Birmingham School of Law and Miles Law School (unaffiliated with Miles College) are state accredited law programs.

There are four institutions of higher learning in Alabama that are listed among Tier 1 national universities by U.S. News & World Report - The University of Alabama (UA), Auburn University (AU), the University of Alabama at Birmingham (UAB), and The University of Alabama in Huntsville (UAH). 

These four universities are also classified among "R1: Doctoral Universities – Very high research activity: "The University of Alabama, The University of Alabama at Birmingham, The University of Alabama in Huntsville, and Auburn University as of February 2022.

Institutions

Out-of-state institutions

Additionally, several for-profit colleges and universities based in other states have campuses in Alabama:

 Fortis Institute has campuses in Birmingham, Dothan, Foley, Mobile, and Montgomery
Herzing University has a campus in Birmingham
Remington College has a campus in Mobile
South University has a campus in Montgomery
Strayer University has campuses in Birmingham, Decatur, Huntsville, and Montgomery

Defunct institutions

See also

 List of college athletic programs in Alabama
 Higher education in the United States
 List of American institutions of higher education
 List of recognized higher education accreditation organizations

Notes

References

External links
Department of Education listing of accredited institutions in Alabama

 
Alabama
Colleges and universities